Nezhinsky is a rural locality (a settlement) and the administrative center of Nezhinskoye Rural Settlement, Olkhovsky District, Volgograd Oblast, Russia. The population was 492 as of 2010. There are 17 streets.

Geography 
Nezhinsky is located 36 km northwest of Olkhovka (the district's administrative centre) by road. Peskovatsky is the nearest rural locality.

References 

Rural localities in Olkhovsky District